is a passenger railway station located in the city of  Wakayama, Wakayama Prefecture, Japan, operated by the private railway operator Nankai Electric Railway.

Line
Wakayamakō Station is the terminus of the Wakayamako Line, and has the station number "NK45-1".

Layout
The station has one elevated island platform.

Platforms

Adjacent stations

History
Wakayamakō Station opened on March 6, 1971.

Passenger statistics
In fiscal 2019, the station was used by an average of 478 passengers daily (boarding passengers only).

Surrounding area
 Kinokawa River
 Kao Wakayama Plant / Wakayama Research Institute
 Wakayama Port Office, Kinki Regional Development Bureau, Ministry of Land, Infrastructure, Transport and Tourism 
 Ministry of Land, Infrastructure, Transport and Tourism Kinki Transportation Bureau Wakayama Transportation Bureau Main Government Building

See also
List of railway stations in Japan

References

External links

  

Railway stations in Japan opened in 1971
Stations of Nankai Electric Railway
Railway stations in Wakayama Prefecture
Wakayama (city)